Lomonosovskaya is a station on the Nevsko–Vasileostrovskaya Line of the Saint Petersburg Metro, opened on December 21, 1970. It is named after Russian polymath Mikhail Lomonosov.

External links

Saint Petersburg Metro stations
Railway stations in Russia opened in 1970
1970 establishments in the Soviet Union
Railway stations located underground in Russia